
Council of Nine can refer to:

In Greek mythology
In Greek mythology, when Prometheus gave Fire to mankind, he infuriated Zeus, so to punish Prometheus, Zeus had him chained to a rock and every day an eagle came down and ate his liver. Because he was immortal, the liver grew back and the eagle returned to do the same to him the next day. To punish mankind, Zeus and eight other deities gathered to form the Council of Nine. The council members were Aphrodite, Apollo, Athena, Demeter, Hephaestus, Hera, Hermes, Poseidon and Zeus.

Together this council created Pandora, and sent her, as a gift, to  Epimetheus. Epimetheus was also given Pandora's Box, and told to never open it. Curiosity got the better of Pandora and she opened the box, releasing all of the misfortunes of Mankind.

In the Church of Satan

The council that governs the Church of Satan call themselves the Council of Nine.

In music

"Council of Nine" is a dark ambient musical project by Maximillian Olivier released on the Cryo Chamber label.

In politics

The Republic of Siena in Italy was ruled by the Council of Nine during the early Renaissance. Its members were changed every two months.

In fiction
In C. J. Cherryh's Alliance-Union universe, the "Council of Nine" is a branch of the government of Union.  Each Councillor is elected by and represents one of the nine constituent occupational Bureaus: Science, Defense, Trade, State, Citizens, Information, Industry, Internal Affairs and Finance. 
In the "Imaginationland Episode II" and "Imaginationland Episode III" episodes of South Park, Imaginationland was led by a "Council of Nine" composed of Aslan, Gandalf, Glinda the Good Witch, Jesus, Luke Skywalker, Morpheus, Popeye, Wonder Woman, and Zeus.
In Robert Jordan's The Wheel of Time series, the "Council of Nine" is one of the governing bodies of the Kingdom of Illian.

In role-playing games
In the role-playing game Mage: the Ascension, the "Council of Nine" is the highest authority of The Traditions, an alliance of secret societies. Each tradition appoints one representative, usually one of the highest masters of that Tradition, to a seat on the Council.

Notes

Greek deities